Wálter Guevara Arze was inaugurated on 8 August 1979 as Provisional President of Bolivia and formed his cabinet on 9 August 1979.

PRA – Authentic Revolutionary Party

MNR – Revolutionary Nationalist Movement

PDC – Christian Democratic Party

MIR – Revolutionary Left Movement

PSD – Social Democratic Party

mil – military

ind – independent

Notes

Cabinets of Bolivia
Cabinets established in 1979
Cabinets disestablished in 1979
1979 establishments in Bolivia
1979 disestablishments in Bolivia